Taenaris artemis  is a species of butterfly in the family Nymphalidae. It was first described by Samuel Constantinus Snellen van Vollenhoven in 1860. It is found in the  Australasian realm

Subspecies
T. a. artemis (West Irian, Mioswar Island)
T. a. jamesi    Butler, [1877]  (Papua, Yule Island, Darnley Island)
T. a. staudingeri   (Honrath, 1889) (New Guinea)
T. a. gisela   Fruhstorfer, 1904 (Waigeu)
T. a. celsa  Fruhstorfer, 1904  (Salawati)
T. a. ziada   Fruhstorfer, 1904 (Misool)
T. a. myopina   Fruhstorfer, 1904  (Aru)
T. a. zenada  Fruhstorfer, 1904  (New Guinea: Onin Peninsula to Geelvink Bay, Kapaur)
T. a. blandina   Fruhstorfer, 1904  (Jobi Island)
T. a. humboldti   Fruhstorfer, 1904  (Humboldt Bay)
T. a. electra   Fruhstorfer, 1904  (Fergusson, Goodenough, Normanby)
T. a. tineutus  Fruhstorfer, 1905 (Woodlark Island)
T. a. reducta   Rothschild, 1915  (Vulcan Island, Manam Island)
T. a. queenslandica    Rothschild, 1916  (northern Queensland: Cape York)
T. a. madu   Brooks, 1944 (Biak)
T. a. pedus  Brooks, 1944  (Gebe Island)
T. a. zetes  Brooks, 1944   (Murray Island)
T. a. affinis   Kirby, 1889  (Rossel Island, Yela Island)
T. a. melanops Grose-Smith, 1897  (Sud Est, New Guinea, Tagula Island)

References

External links
Taenaris at Markku Savela's Lepidoptera and Some Other Life Forms

Taenaris
Butterflies described in 1860
Butterflies of Oceania
Taxa named by Samuel Constantinus Snellen van Vollenhoven